The Sheriff is the oldest secular office under the Crown. Formerly the Sheriff was the principal law enforcement officer in the county but over the centuries most of the responsibilities associated with the post have been transferred elsewhere or are now defunct, so that its functions are now largely ceremonial.

Sheriff is a title originating in the time of the Angles, not long after the invasion of the Kingdom of England, which was in existence for around a thousand years. A list of the sheriffs from the Norman conquest onwards can be found below. The Shrievalties are the oldest secular titles under the Crown in England and Wales, their purpose being to represent the monarch at a local level, historically in the shires.

The office was a powerful position in earlier times, especially in the case of Yorkshire, which covers a very large area. The sheriffs were responsible for the maintenance of law and order and various other roles. Some of their powers in Yorkshire were relinquished in 1547 as the Lord Lieutenant of Yorkshire was instated to deal with military duties. It was only in 1908 under Edward VII of the United Kingdom that the Lord Lieutenant became more senior than the Sheriff. Since then the position of Sheriff has become more ceremonial, with many of its previous responsibilities transferred to High Court judges, magistrates, coroners, local authorities and the police.

In 1974, under the Local Government Act 1972, the single Yorkshire shrievalty was abolished, with high sheriffs appointed to each of the new metropolitan and non-metropolitan counties. Today the position is represented at a more local level in the form of four titles; the High Sheriff of the East Riding of Yorkshire, High Sheriff of North Yorkshire, High Sheriff of South Yorkshire and High Sheriff of West Yorkshire.

Sheriffs

House of Normandy

House of Plantagenet

House of Lancaster

House of York

House of Tudor

House of Stuart

Commonwealth

House of Stuart, restoration

Queen Anne

House of Hanover

House of Saxe-Coburg-Gotha

House of Windsor

References

External links
HighSheriffs.com

Yorkshire
 
Yorkshire
History of Yorkshire
Yorkshire-related lists